Valentin Dzhavelkov (born 11 February 1968) is a Bulgarian modern pentathlete. He competed at the 1992 Summer Olympics.

References

External links
 

1968 births
Living people
Bulgarian male modern pentathletes
Olympic modern pentathletes of Bulgaria
Modern pentathletes at the 1992 Summer Olympics
People from Petrich
Sportspeople from Blagoevgrad Province